The 2015 Generali Ladies Linz was a women's tennis tournament played on indoor hard courts. It was the 29th edition of the Generali Ladies Linz, and part of the WTA International tournaments-category of the 2015 WTA Tour. It was held at the TipsArena Linz in Linz, Austria, on 12–18 October 2015.

Points and prize money

Point distribution

Prize money

1 Qualifiers prize money is also the Round of 32 prize money
* per team

Singles entrants

Seeds 

 Rankings as of October 5, 2015

Other entrants 
The following players received wildcards into the singles main draw:
  Barbara Haas
  Tamira Paszek
  Andrea Petkovic
  Lucie Šafářová

The following players received entry from the qualifying draw:
  Kiki Bertens
  Klára Koukalová
  Aleksandra Krunić
  Stefanie Vögele

The following player received entry as a lucky loser:
  Johanna Konta

Withdrawals 
Before the tournament
  Sara Errani →replaced by  Kirsten Flipkens
  Daniela Hantuchová →replaced by  Anna-Lena Friedsam
  Madison Keys →replaced by  Misaki Doi
  Karin Knapp →replaced by  Margarita Gasparyan
  Tsvetana Pironkova →replaced by  Andreea Mitu
  Anna Karolína Schmiedlová (viral illness) → replaced by  Johanna Konta

Doubles entrants

Seeds 

1 Rankings as of October 5, 2015

Other entrants 
The following pairs received wildcards into the doubles main draw:
  Annika Beck /  Tamira Paszek
  Sandra Klemenschits /  Carina Witthöft

Champions

Singles 

  Anastasia Pavlyuchenkova defeated  Anna-Lena Friedsam, 6–4, 6–3

Doubles 

  Raquel Kops-Jones /  Abigail Spears defeated   Andrea Hlaváčková /  Lucie Hradecká, 6–3, 7–5

External links 
 

2015 WTA Tour
2015
Generali Ladies Linz
October 2015 sports events in Europe
Generali